This article is about the list of Académica da Praia players.  Sporting Clube da Praia is a Cape Verdean football (soccer) club based in Praia, Cape Verde and plays at Estádio da Várzea.  The club was formed in 1962.

One of the greatest players were Luís Bastos and in the 2000s, Caló.

List of players

Notes

References

Académica da Praia
Academica Praia

Académica Praia article on the Portuguese Wikipedia
Association football player non-biographical articles